Schwiebea is a genus of mites in the family Acaridae. It is among the largest in the family with over 60 species.

Description 
Adults of Schwiebea are distinguished from other mites by: the absence of many setae, the reduction of supracoxal seta of leg I to a tiny spine, and the absence of Grandjean's organ. Additionally, the propodosomal sclerite has a posterior indentation/incision for up to 50% of its length. Females have a spermatheca (organ for receiving and storing sperm) and its morphology is important for distinguishing species.

Habitat 
Schwiebea have been collected from various habitats including vegetation (clover roots, a verbena field, peony rose, Gerbera roots, yams, taro seeds), leaf litter, peat moss, caves, insect rearing containers and even some aquatic environments (fish farms, aquariums, swimming pools). Some species attach phoretically to arthropods such as bark beetles, millipedes and ticks.

Reproduction 
Some species of Schwiebea are all-female and reproduce by parthenogenesis, while others use sexual reproduction. Parthenogenesis is thought to have evolved at least three times within the genus.

Pest status 
One species, S. similis, is a pest of American ginseng in China. A scientific study found it can also feed on other crops to varying extents, including garlic, potato and Chinese yam.

Species
 Schwiebea afroaustralis Mahunka, 1979
 Schwiebea aksuensis Bugrov, 1995
 Schwiebea aquatilis Fain, 1982
 Schwiebea armata (Mahunka, 1979)
 Schwiebea capitata (Mahunka, 1979)
 Schwiebea cavernicola Vitzthum, 1932
 Schwiebea cavicola Mahunka, 1978
 Schwiebea cepa Karg, 1987
 Schwiebea codognoensis Fain & Pagani, 1989
 Schwiebea coniferae (Sevastianov & Tamam-Nasem-Marros, 1993)
 Schwiebea cuncta Ho, 1993
 Schwiebea danielopoli Fain, 1982
 Schwiebea elongata (Banks, 1906)
 Schwiebea estradai Fain & Ferrando, 1991
 Schwiebea eurynymphae (Oudemans, 1911)
 Schwiebea hibernica Purvis & Evans, 1982
 Schwiebea italica Oudemans, 1924
 Schwiebea jiangxiensis Jiang, 1995
 Schwiebea koerneri Turk & Turk, 1957
 Schwiebea kurilensis Bugrov, 1995
 Schwiebea laphriae (Samsinak, 1956)
 Schwiebea longibursata Fain & Wauthy, 1979
 Schwiebea montana Bugrov, 1995
 Schwiebea neomycolicha Klimov, 1998
 Schwiebea nesbitti Turk & Turk, 1957
 Schwiebea nova (Oudemans, 1906)
 Schwiebea obesa Fain & Fauvel, 1988
 Schwiebea piceae Bugrov, 1995
 Schwiebea podicis (Ashfaq & Chaudhri, 1986)
 Schwiebea ruienensis Fain & Wauthy, 1979
 Schwiebea sakhalinensis Bugrov, 1995
 Schwiebea similis (Manson, 1972)
 Schwiebea subterranea Fain, 1982
 Schwiebea taiwanensis Ho, 1993
 Schwiebea talpa Oudemans, 1916
 Schwiebea tuzkoliensis Bugrov, 1995
 Schwiebea ulmi Jacot, 1936
 Schwiebea zhangzhouensis Lin-Zhonghua & Lin-Baoshu, 2000

References

Acaridae